Knies is a surname. Notable people with the surname include:

 Karl Knies (born 1821), German economist
 Matthew Knies (born 2002), American ice hockey player